Kunwar Singh (born: 13 November 1777 – died: 26 April 1858), also known as Babu Kunwar Singh, was a leader and military commander during the Indian Rebellion of 1857. He led a selected band of armed soldiers against the troops under the command of the British East India Company. He was the chief organiser of the fight against the British in Bihar.

Early life
Kunwar Singh was born on 13 November 1777 to Shahabzada Singh and Panchratan Devi, in Jagdishpur of the Shahabad (now Bhojpur) district, in the state of Bihar. He belonged to the Ujjainiya Rajput clan. A British judicial officer offered a description of Kunwar Singh and described him as "a tall man, about six feet in height". He went on to describe him as having a broad face with an aquiline nose. In terms of his hobbies, British officials describe him as being a keen huntsman who also enjoyed horse-riding.

After his father's death in 1826, Kunwar Singh became the taluqdar of Jagdishpur. His brothers inherited some villages however a dispute arose as to their exact allocation. This dispute was eventually settled and the brothers seemingly returned to having cordial relations.

He married the daughter of Raja Fateh Naraiyan Singh, a wealthy zamindar of the Deo Raj estate in Gaya district who belonged to the Sisodia clan of Rajputs.

Role in the 1857 rebellion 

Singh led the Indian Rebellion of 1857 in Bihar. He was nearly eighty and in failing health when he was called upon to take up arms. He was assisted by both his brother, Babu Amar Singh and his commander-in-chief, Hare Krishna Singh. Some argue that the latter was the real reason behind Kunwar Singh's initial military success. He was a tough opponent  and harried British forces for nearly a year. He was an expert in the art of guerilla warfare. His tactics sometimes left the British puzzled.

Singh assumed command of the soldiers who had revolted at Danapur on 25 July. Two days later he occupied Arrah, the district headquarters. Major Vincent Eyre relieved the town on 3 August, defeated Singh's force and destroyed Jagdishpur. During the rebellion, his army had to cross the Ganges river. The army of Brigadier Douglas began to shoot at their boat. One of the bullets shattered Singh's left wrist. Singh felt that his hand had become useless and that there was the additional risk of infection due to the bullet-shot. He drew his sword and cut off his left hand near the elbow and offered it to the Ganges.

Singh left his ancestral village and reached Lucknow in December 1857 where he met with other rebel leaders. In March 1858 he occupied Azamgarh and managed to repel the initial British attempts to take the area. However, he had to leave the place soon. Pursued by Douglas, he retreated towards his home in Ara, Bihar. On 23 April, Singh had a victory near Jagdispur over the force led by Captain le Grand (le gard in Hindi). On 26 April 1858 he died in his village. The mantle of the old chief now fell on his brother Amar Singh II who continued the struggle for a considerable time, running a parallel government in the district of Shahabad. In October 1859, Amar Singh II joined the rebel leaders in the Nepal Terai.

Death
In his last battle, fought on 23 April 1858, near Jagdispur, the troops under the control of the British East India Company were completely routed. On 22 and 23 April, being injured he fought against the British Army and with the help of his army, achieved victory, the battle ending when he brought down the Union Jack from Jagdispur Fort and hoisted his flag. He returned to his palace on 23 April 1858 and soon died on 26 April 1858.

Contemporary British accounts

Sir George Trevelyan, a British statesman and author noted about Kunwar Singh and the battle of Arrah in his book, The Competition Wallah, that:

George Bruce Malleson, a 19th-century English officer stationed in India during the rebellion of 1857 stated about Kunwar Singh:

Legacy
To honour his contribution to India's freedom movement, the Republic of India issued a commemorative stamp on 23 April 1966. The Government of Bihar established the Veer Kunwar Singh University, Arrah, in 1992.

In 2017, the Veer Kunwar Singh Setu, also known as the Arrah–Chhapra Bridge, was inaugurated to connect north and south Bihar. In 2018, to celebrate 160th anniversary of Kunwar Singh's death, the government of Bihar relocated a statue of him to Hardinge Park. The park was also officially renamed as 'Veer Kunwar Singh Azadi Park'.

He is mentioned in many Bhojpuri folk songs as a hero who fought against British oppression. One particular folk song states:

In the 1970s, a private landlord militia known as the 'Kuer Sena/Kunwar Sena' (Kunwar's Army) was formed by Rajput youth in Bihar to combat naxalite insurgents. It was named after Kunwar Singh.

A play by Jagdish Chandra Mathur titled Vijay Ki Vela (Moment of Victory) is based on the later part of Kunwar Singh's life. He is also mentioned in the poem "Jhansi Ki Rani" by Subhadra Kumari Chauhan.

In April 2022, Indian Home minister Amit Shah announced the installation of a statue commemorating Kunwar Singh at Ara, Bhojpur. About 78,000 national flags were waved by the public as a matter of world record during this announcement.

See also
 History of Bihar
 Veer Kunwar Singh Museum

References

External links

 

Revolutionaries of the Indian Rebellion of 1857
1858 deaths
1777 births
People from Bhojpur district, India
History of Bihar
Indian independence activists from Bihar
Indian Hindus
Rajputs
Rajput rulers
1857 in India
1858 in India
Indian independence activists
Resistance to the British Empire
19th-century rebellions